The 2000 Insight.com Bowl was the 12th edition of the bowl game. It featured the Pittsburgh Panthers and the Iowa State Cyclones.

Pitt scored first on a 72-yard touchdown pass from John Turman to Antonio Bryant, taking an early 7–0 lead. Iowa State answered with a 23-yard pass from Sage Rosenfels to Chris Anthony, tying the game at 7, at the end of the 1st quarter.

In the second quarter, Joe Woodley scored on a 1-yard touchdown run for ISU making it 13–7. Ennis Haywood added a 3-yard touchdown run making it 20–7. Sage Rosenfels threw his second touchdown pass of the game, a 9 yarder to Chris Anthony, as Iowa State made it 27–7 at halftime.

In the third quarter, Pitt quarterback Rod Rutherford scored on a 2-yard touchdown run, making it 27–14. John Turman later threw a 44-yard touchdown pass to Antonio Bryant making it 27–20.

In the fourth quarter, Iowa State's JaMaine Billups scored on a 72-yard punt return, bringing Iowa State to 34–20. Pitt's Nick Lotz kicked a 25-yard field goal, cutting the deficit to 34–23. Kevan Barlow scored on a 3-yard touchdown run, but the 2-point conversion attempt failed, leaving the score at 34–29. Iowa State's Carl Gomez kicked a 41-yard field goal to cap the scoring at 37–29.

Sage Rosenfels and Reggie Hayward got the MVPs. This was Iowa State's first bowl victory in school history after four previous losses.

Scoring summary

References

Insight.com Bowl
Guaranteed Rate Bowl
Pittsburgh Panthers football bowl games
Iowa State Cyclones football bowl games
Sports in Phoenix, Arizona
Insight.com Bowl
2000s in Phoenix, Arizona